Casco Bay Island, formerly Casco Island, is a private island located in Passamaquoddy Bay, between Campobello Island and Deer Island, in New Brunswick, Canada.  The island is approximately 41 acres in size, at the mean high tide line. Found at 44°57'20" North and 66°55'55" West.

References 

Coastal islands of New Brunswick
Private islands of Canada